Buzz is the third studio album by California punk band Fifteen.  The album was released on CD, LP, and cassette by the now-defunct label Grass Records, in 1994. It was re-released on CD by Grass Records on August 27, 1996, then re-released again on CD by Plan-It-X Records on November 14, 2006. It is considered by many to be the best album by the band, including Brendan Kelly of The Lawrence Arms.

Track listing
 "World Starvation" - 3:06
 "Helter Smelter" - 2:49
 "No Tion" - 2:41
 "Situations" - 2:20
 "I Keep on Tryin'" - 2:37 
 "Question" - 3:54
 "Violation" - 3:19
 "Fifteen" - 2:30
 "Food Not Bombs" - 2:28
 "Predisposition" - 3:54
 "Abel's Song" - 1:41
 "In Our World" - 4:07

Personnel 
 Jeff Ott – lead vocals, guitar
 Jack Curran – bass, backing vocals
 Chris Flanagan– drums, backing vocals
 Noah Rection– Harmonica

Production
 Noah Rection – producer
 Merry Gregg- Cover Design
 Kim A.- Cover Art

References

Fifteen (band) albums
1994 albums
Plan-It-X Records albums